Linwood Township may refer to one of the following places within the United States:

 Linwood Township, Anoka County, Minnesota
 Linwood Township, Butler County, Nebraska

Township name disambiguation pages